John Anderson Collins (1810–1879) was an American abolitionist.

Biography
Collins was born in Manchester, Vermont. He attended Middlebury College, joined the Andover Theological Seminary, and eventually left both to work in the anti-slavery movement. From 1840–1842, Collins served as the General Agent and Vice President of the Massachusetts Anti-Slavery Society (MASS, founded 1835), a Boston branch of the American Anti-Slavery Society.

He helped to mentor Frederick Douglass as Douglass began to become a speaker on the abolitionist circuit.

A Congregationalist at first (eventually turning to atheism,) he worked with Quakers and Garrisonian abolitionists in the Society for Universal Inquiry and Reform, which hoped to reorganize society along Christian non-resistance lines.

Collins was the editor of the abolitionist periodicals The Monthly Offering and Monthly Garland.

He combined abolitionism with communitarianism. He became a leader in the Skaneateles Community, an 1841–1846 Fourierist socialist experimental community, and edited The Communitist.

In his later years, he left abolitionism and communal utopianism behind, going to California to follow the gold rush and becoming a Whig candidate for the state legislature.

Bibliography

References

1810 births
1879 deaths
People from Manchester, Vermont
American abolitionists